Lemoa is a town and municipality located in the province of Biscay, in the autonomous community of Basque Country, northern Spain.

Sports
 SD Lemona (Football) in Segunda División B

Notable people
 Gurutzi Arregi (1936-2020), ethnographer

References

External links
 LEMOA in the Bernardo Estornés Lasa - Auñamendi Encyclopedia (Euskomedia Fundazioa) 

Municipalities in Biscay